The History of the Crusades for the Recovery and Possession of the Holy Land was a two-volume work published in 1820 by Charles Mills. It criticized David Hume and Edward Gibbon. Mills grouped the Crusades into nine entities:

 First Crusade and Crusade of 1101
 Second Crusade
 Third Crusade
 Crusade of 1197
 Fourth Crusade
 Fifth Crusade and Sixth Crusade
 Baron's Crusade
 Seventh Crusade
 Eighth Crusade and Lord Edward's Crusade.

Mills' work was not as dominant in his country as was that of Joseph François Michaud and Friedrich Wilken in theirs. Mills’ history also used the theme of the role of Richard I (the Lionheart) as a crusading and royal English parallel to Louis IX. His successors opened discussion in England of the Crusades as precursors of modern colonization, with a strong tinge of British Christian Zionism.

References

External links 
https://web.archive.org/web/20051109203701/http://www.fpri.org/orbis/4801/peters.firanj.html
History of the Crusades at the Internet Archive

1820 non-fiction books
Books about the Crusades
English non-fiction books